Jalan Parit Panjang (Johor state route J107) is a major road in Johor, Malaysia. It is also a main route to North–South Expressway Southern Route via Sedenak Interchange.

List of junctions

Roads in Johor